İkinci Çağan (also, Chagan Vtoroy, Chagan Vtoroye, and Chagan-Mimed-Salim) is a village in the Shamakhi Rayon in Azerbaijan. The village now forms part of the municipality of Çağan.

References 

Populated places in Shamakhi District